John and William Rufford were English 14th century Bell founders. They were probably father and son and were the successive owners of a foundry in Toddington, Bedfordshire. Royal effigies appear on their bells. They were producing bells between 1353—1400.

References 

Bell foundries of the United Kingdom
People from Toddington, Bedfordshire